Ivan Grigoryevich Shcheglovitov (– 5 September 1918) was a right-wing politician who served as the Russian minister of Justice and the last chairman of the State Council of the Russian Empire.

Life 
Graduate of the Imperial School of Law. Held various posts in the Senate and the Ministry of Justice between 1890 and 1905;  Assistant Minister of Justice (1906), Minister of Justice (1906-1915), Member of the State Council (1907), and Chairman of the State Council (January 1917).  Shcheglovitov was one of the main instigators of a notorious Blood libel case against Menachem Beilis in 1913.

After the February Revolution he was imprisoned by the Bolsheviks  in the Peter and Paul Fortress; later transferred to Moscow and executed by the Bolsheviks during the period of Red Terror.

Reference

Source
 V.I. Gurko. Features And Figures Of The Past. Government And Opinion In The Reign Of Nicholas II.
 

1861 births
1918 deaths
Imperial School of Jurisprudence alumni
Members of the State Council (Russian Empire)
Members of the Russian Assembly
People from Pochepsky District
People from Starodubsky Uyezd
Victims of Red Terror in Soviet Russia
Justice ministers of Russia
Executed Russian people